The United Nations Economic and Social Commission for Asia and the Pacific (ESCAP) is one of the five regional commissions under the jurisdiction of the United Nations Economic and Social Council. It was established in order to increase economic activity in Asia and the Far East, as well as to foster economic relations between the region and other areas of the world.

The commission is composed of 53 Member States and nine Associate members, mostly from the Asia and Pacific regions. In addition to countries in Asia and the Pacific, the commission's members includes France, the Netherlands, the United Kingdom and the United States.

The region covered by the commission is home to 4.1 billion people, or two-thirds of the world's population, making ESCAP the most comprehensive of the United Nations' five regional commissions.

History 
The commission was first established by the Economic and Social Council on 28 March 1947 as the United Nations Economic Commission for Asia and the Far East (ECAFE) to assist in post-war economic reconstruction. Its main mandate was to "initiate and participate in measures for facilitating concerted action for the economic reconstruction and development of Asia and the Far East."

On 1 August 1974, the commission was renamed to the Economic and Social Commission for Asia and the Pacific (ESCAP) by the Economic and Social Council to reflect both the economic and social aspects of the Commission's work, as well as geographic location of its members.

Scope 
The commission works to address some of the greatest challenges facing the region through results-oriented projects, technical assistance and capacity building to member states in the following areas:

 Macroeconomic policy and development
 Trade and investment
 Transport
 Social development
 Environment and sustainable development
 Information and communications technology and disaster risk reduction
 Statistics
 Sub-regional activities for development
 Energy

Additionally, the commission provides a forum for its member states to promote regional cooperation and collective action in pursuit of the 2030 Agenda for Sustainable Development.

Member states 
There are a total of 53 Member States, 3 of them are not part of Asia or Oceania

Full members 
The following are all full members of the commission:

Associate Members 
The following are all associate members of the commission:

 
 
 
 
 
  Northern Mariana Islands (The)
  Hong Kong, China
  Macao, China
  Cook Islands (The)

Locations

Headquarters 

The commission was originally located in Shanghai, Republic of China, from its foundation until 1949, when it moved its headquarters to United Nations Conference Centre in Bangkok, Thailand.

Subregional offices 
The Commission maintains five subregional offices in order to better target and deliver programs, given the large size of the region. The subregions are as follow:
 Incheon, Republic of Korea (East and North-East Asia subregional headquarters)
 Almaty, Kazakhstan (North and Central Asia subregional headquarters)
 Suva, Fiji (The Pacific subregional headquarters)
 New Delhi, India (South and South-West Asia subregional headquarters)
 Jakarta, Indonesia (South-East Asia subregional headquarters / ASEAN)

Executive Secretaries 

The following is a list of the executive secretaries of the commission since its foundation:

Publications 
The commission releases a variety of publications detailing its work and updates on its mandate, as well as on a wide variety of issues affecting its member states. Some of these publications include:

 Asia-Pacific Countries with Special Needs Development Report
 Asia-Pacific Development Journal
 Asia-Pacific Disaster Report
 Asia-Pacific Trade and Investment Report
 Economic and Social Survey of Asia and the Pacific
 Review of Development in Transport in Asia and the Pacific
 SDG Progress Assessment Reports / Statistical Yearbook for Asia and the Pacific

See also 
 United Nations System
 United Nations Economic and Social Commission for Western Asia
 United Nations Economic Commission for Europe (overlapping membership)
 United Nations Economic Commission for Latin America and the Caribbean (overlapping membership)
 Trans-Asian Railway Network Agreement
 Asian Highway Network

References

External links
 UN Economic and Social Commission for Asia and the Pacific
 ESCAP Pacific Operations Centre EPOC
 Centre for Alleviation of Poverty through Secondary Crops' Development in Asia and the Pacific (CAPSA)
 The publication Asia and the Pacific: A Story of Transformation and Resurgence provides a detailed overview of ESCAP's work since the late 1940s (1947-2014).

United Nations Development Group
Economic and Social Commission for Asia and the Pacific
Economic and Social Commission for Asia and the Pacific
Organizations established in 1947
Organizations based in Bangkok
Thailand and the United Nations
Politics of Asia
Politics of Oceania